Matteo Badilatti (born 30 July 1992 in Poschiavo) is a Swiss cyclist, who currently rides for UCI ProTeam . In October 2020, he was named in the startlist for the 2020 Vuelta a España, where he finished 110th overall.

Major results

2017
 9th Overall Tour du Jura
2018
 2nd Overall Tour de Savoie Mont-Blanc
 7th Overall Tour de l'Ain
 8th Overall Tour of Hainan
 9th Overall Tour of Austria
2019
 3rd Overall Tour du Rwanda
2020
 3rd Overall Sibiu Cycling Tour
 4th Overall Tour de Hongrie
2021
 3rd Overall Tour de l'Ain
2022
 10th Classic Grand Besançon Doubs
2023
 1st Stage 6 Tour du Rwanda

Grand Tour general classification results timeline

References

External links

1992 births
Living people
Swiss male cyclists
People from Poschiavo
Sportspeople from Graubünden